The 1894 Romford by-election was held on 2 April 1894 after the death of the incumbent Conservative MP James Theobald.  The seat was retained by the Conservative Party candidate Alfred Money Wigram.

References 

By-elections to the Parliament of the United Kingdom in Essex constituencies
April 1894 events
Romford
1894 elections in the United Kingdom
1894 in England
1890s in Essex